Vilhelm Munk Nielsen (born 30 December 1955) is a Danish former footballer who played as a forward for OB. He played five games for the Denmark national football team.

Club career
A key player for OB during almost a decade, Munk Nielsen stands third on the all-time top goalscorer list for the club with 102 goals in 239 appearances. After his career in OB, he played several years for Odense Kammeraternes Sportsklub (OKS) before retiring.

International career
Munk Nielsen gained his first international cap for Denmark on 12 August 1981 in a 2–1 win over Finland. He made a total of five appearances for the national team.

References

External links
Danish national team profile

1955 births
Living people
Association football forwards
Danish men's footballers
Danish Superliga players
Odense Boldklub players
Odense Kammeraternes Sportsklub players
Denmark international footballers